The 2018 Open 13 Provence was a men's tennis tournament played on indoor hard courts. It was the 25th edition of the Open 13, and part of the ATP World Tour 250 series of the 2018 ATP World Tour. It took at the Palais des Sports in Marseille, France, from 19 February through 25 February 2018. Ninth-seeded Karen Khachanov won the singles title.

Points and prize money

Point distribution

Prize money

Singles main-draw entrants

Seeds 

 Rankings are as of February 12, 2018.

Other entrants 
The following players received wildcards into the main draw:
  Félix Auger-Aliassime 
  Roberto Bautista Agut 
  Hugo Gaston

The following player received entry as an alternate:
  Blaž Kavčič

The following players received entry from the qualifying draw:
  Ruben Bemelmans 
  Norbert Gombos
  Ilya Ivashka
  Stefano Travaglia

The following player received entry as a lucky loser:
  Sergiy Stakhovsky

Withdrawals 
Before the tournament
  David Goffin → replaced by  Blaž Kavčič
  Florian Mayer → replaced by  Sergiy Stakhovsky
  Jan-Lennard Struff → replaced by  Malek Jaziri
  Yūichi Sugita → replaced by  Stefanos Tsitsipas
  Jo-Wilfried Tsonga → replaced by  Laslo Đere

Retirements 
  Damir Džumhur
  Stan Wawrinka

Doubles main-draw entrants

Seeds 

1 Rankings are as of February 12, 2018.

Other entrants 
The following pairs received wildcards into the main draw:
  David Guez /  Quentin Halys
  Antoine Hoang /  Alexandre Müller

The following pair received entry as alternates:
  Thomas Fabbiano /  Stefano Travaglia

Withdrawals 
Before the tournament
  Daniil Medvedev

Finals

Singles 

  Karen Khachanov defeated  Lucas Pouille, 7–5, 3–6, 7–5

Doubles 

  Raven Klaasen /  Michael Venus defeated  Marcus Daniell /  Dominic Inglot, 6–7(2–7), 6–3, [10–4]

References

External links 
Official website

Open 13
Open 13
Open 13